Charles Paul (born 27 July 1933) is a Guyanese cricketer. He played in two first-class matches for British Guiana in 1953/54 and 1954/55.

See also
 List of Guyanese representative cricketers

References

External links
 

1933 births
Living people
Guyanese cricketers
Guyana cricketers